This is a list of values of total fertility rates by federal subjects of Russia.

TFR by federal subjects
Source: Суммарный коэффициент рождаемости

TFR by ethnic group

Out of the dozens of groups listed here, only some have an above replacement fertility (2.06), namely Roma (2.620), Tabasarans (2.327), Turks (2.236), Avars (2.166), Dargins (2.158), Altaians (2.154), Tajiks (2.141) and Kumyks (2.066).

For Jews, the TFR is almost less than half of that needed for replacement. The lowest TFR were registered among Jews (1.282), Russians (1.442), Georgians (1.446) and Ossetians (1.510).

Comparison with the 1989 census shows huge drop in fertility in the Western Caucasus (esp. Karachay-Cherkessia, Adygea and North Ossetia) and some parts of Arctic Russia (Murmansk, Komi, etc.).

The fertility in the Eastern Caucasus is fairly stable, although decreasing.

The figures given are from the 2021 census; the lowest birth rate recorded in Russia was in 1999, it increased thereafter and the birth rate is 9.6 in 2021 compared to 8.7 in 1999.

Natural growth by federal subject
The figures are from 2022.

Notes
a.  Not recognized internationally as a part of Russia.

See also
Demographics of Russia

References

http://demoscope.ru/weekly/2007/0279/barom03.php

Fertility
Demographics of Russia
Russia, fertility rate